The Sri Lanka Army  General Service Corps  (SLAGSC) a corps of the Sri Lanka Army. The corps carries out much of the administrative work of the army. The role of the Corps is to provide logistic backing to Regular and Volunteer units by performing Financial/ Accounting Services, pay duties, legal services, running of agriculture projects and farms etc. Therefore, it is made up of Accountants, Legal Officers, Agriculture Offices, data processing officers and other ranks specialized in those fields. It is made up of a 3 regular units and 3 volunteer (reserve) units and is headquartered at its Regiment Center at the Panagoda Cantonment, Panagoda.

Directorates and Branches
Directorate of Internal Audit
Directorate of Budget & Financial Management
Directorate of Pay & Records.
Directorate of Legal Services.
Army Band and cultural troupe.
Financial Management Branch.

History
The Ceylon Army General Service Corps was raised on 14 December 1951 with Lt. Col B.J Wijemanne, MBE, ED as first Commanding Officer. The unit was then administered by the headquarters company of the Army HQ. The Pay and Records Wing which was established on 14 October 1949 and the Education Branch were amalgamated in 1954. The Army Education Branch was instrumental in translating army forms, preparation of a comprehensive Sinhala vocabulary and teaching Sinhala to those who were yet conversant in the language.

The Army Band was formed on 22 June 1950 with Lt (Quarter Master) George Perry, a seconded officer form the British Army and 28 local bandsmen. In 1955 the then Acting Commander of the Army Col.  H.W.G Wijekoon, OBE, ED, CLI (later Major General) initiated the forming of the Hewisi Band along with Lt C.T Caldera, CLI and Mr Lional Edirisinghe who was one of Sri Lanka's foremost musicians. S/Sgt Wickramasinghe D. was the first Bandmaster. The cultural troupe of the National Service Regiment (NSR) under Captain Clarence Delwela was absorbed into the SLAGSC when the NSR was disbanded in 1977. Today, the regiment has three bands which take part in all military ceremonials in the country and a cultural troupe.

In 1956 a small farm was established at Panagoda which was the beginning of the farm projects in the Army. Maj. R Wijesinghe (later Colonel) was the pioneer agriculturist and the main figure behind the successful farm projects in the Army. Since then the army farms are also a part of the corps responsibility and they provide most of their produce to the Service Corps.

Units

Regular Army
1st Sri Lanka Army General Service Corps
3rd Sri Lanka Army General Service Corps
4th Sri Lanka Army General Service Corps
Trade School Sri Lanka Army General Service Corps - kuttigala

Volunteers
2nd (v) Sri Lanka Army General Service Corps (Formed on 1 December 1996)

5th (v) Sri Lanka Army General Service Corps (Formed on 10 October 2010)
6th (v) Sri Lanka Army General Service Corps (Converted from 32nd Sri Lanka National Guard on 5 May 2011)

Notable members
Brigadier Chamath Gunasinghe

Lt. Colonel Daya Perera, PC - Sri Lankan High Commissioner to Canada and former Ambassador to the United Nations in New York City

Order of precedence

See also
 Sri Lanka Army

External links and sources

 Sri Lanka Army
 Sri Lanka Army General Service Corps

General Service Corps
General Service Corps
Military units and formations established in 1951
1951 establishments in Ceylon